The events of 1964 in anime.

Events 
NBC Enterprises orders an additional 52 episodes of Astro Boy.

Releases

See also
1964 in animation

References

External links 
Japanese animated works of the year, listed in the IMDb

Anime
Anime
Years in anime